BPSD may refer to:
 Behavioural and psychological symptoms of dementia
 Barrels per stream day, unit of oil production rate commonly used in a regions using the oil barrel of 
 Bethel Park School District